This article is a collection of statewide public opinion polls that have been conducted relating to the Super Tuesday Democratic presidential primaries, 2008.

Polling

Alabama
Alabama winner: Barack Obama
Primary date: February 5, 2008
Total Delegates At Stake 52
Total Delegates Won To be determinedSee also

Arizona
Arizona winner: Hillary Clinton
Primary date: February 5, 2008
Total Delegates At Stake 56
Total Delegates Won To be determinedSee also

Arkansas
Arkansas winner: Hillary Clinton
Primary date: February 5, 2008
Delegates At Stake 35
Delegates Won To be determinedSee also

California
California winner: Hillary Clinton
Primary date: February 5, 2008
Delegates At Stake 370
Delegates Won To be determinedSee also

Colorado
Colorado winner: Obama
Primary date: February 5, 2008
Delegates At Stake 55
Delegates Won To be determinedSee also

Connecticut
Connecticut winner: Obama
Primary date: February 5, 2008
Delegates At Stake 48
Delegates Won Barack Obama-26 Hillary Clinton-22See also

Delaware
Delaware winner: Barack Obama
Primary date: February 5, 2008
Delegates At Stake 15
Delegates Won Barack Obama-9 Hillary Clinton-6

Georgia
Georgia winner: Barack Obama
Primary date: February 5, 2008
Delegates At Stake 87
Delegates Won To be determinedSee also

Idaho
Idaho winner: Barack Obama
Primary date: February 5, 2008
Delegates At Stake 18
Delegates Won Barack Obama-15 Hillary Clinton-3

Illinois
Illinois winner: Barack Obama
Primary date: February 5, 2008
Delegates At Stake 153
Delegates Won To be determinedSee also

Kansas
Kansas winner: Barack Obama
Caucus date: (21 of 40 Delegates) February 5, 2008
Delegates At Stake 21 of 40
Delegates Won To be determined

Massachusetts
Massachusetts winner: Hillary Clinton
Primary date: February 5, 2008
Delegates At Stake 93
Delegates Won To be determinedSee also

Minnesota
Minnesota winner: Barack Obama
Primary date: February 5, 2008
Delegates At Stake 72
Delegates Won To be determined

Missouri
Missouri winner: Barack Obama
Primary date: February 5, 2008
Delegates At Stake 72
Delegates Won To be determinedSee also

New Jersey
New Jersey winner: Hillary Clinton
Primary date: February 5, 2008
Delegates At Stake 107
Delegates Won To be determinedSee also

New Mexico
New Mexico winner: Hillary Clinton
Primary date: February 5, 2008
Delegates At Stake 26
Delegates Won To be determinedSee also

New York
New York winner: Hillary Clinton
Primary date: February 5, 2008
Delegates At Stake 232
Delegates Won To be determinedSee also

Oklahoma
Oklahoma winner: Hillary Clinton
Primary date: February 5, 2008
Delegates At Stake 38
Delegates Won To be determinedSee also

Tennessee
Tennessee winner: Hillary Clinton
Primary date: February 5, 2008
Delegates At Stake 68
Delegates Won To be determined

Utah
Utah winner: Obama
Primary date: February 5, 2008
Delegates At Stake 23
Delegates Won To be determinedSee also

References

External links

 2008 Democratic National Convention Website-FAQ gives map with delegation information.
USAElectionPolls.com – Primary polling by state

2008 United States Democratic presidential primaries
Democratic